Coryphopterus alloides, the barfin goby, is a species of goby found in the Western Atlantic Ocean from southern Florida and the Bahamas  all the way to Belize.  

References

Gobiidae
Fish of the Atlantic Ocean
Fish described in 1960
Taxa named by James Erwin Böhlke
Taxa named by Charles Richard Robins